Gabrje pri Soteski is a small settlement in the Municipality of Dolenjske Toplice in Slovenia. It lies on the left bank of the Krka River on the road between Straža and Soteska. The area is part of the historical region of Lower Carniola. The municipality is now included in the Southeast Slovenia Statistical Region.

Name
The name of the settlement was changed from Gabrje to Gabrje pri Soteski in 1953.

References

External links
Gabrje pri Soteski on Geopedia

Populated places in the Municipality of Dolenjske Toplice